Cedar is an unincorporated community located in the town of Gurney, Iron County, Wisconsin, United States.

History
A post office called Cedar was established in 1891, and remained in operation until it was discontinued in 1955. The community was named from groves of cedar near the town site.

References

External links

Unincorporated communities in Iron County, Wisconsin
Unincorporated communities in Wisconsin